Thierry Winston Jordan Ambrose (born 28 March 1997) is a professional footballer who plays as a forward for KV Oostende. A former youth international for France, he plays for the Guadeloupe national team.

International career
Ambrose was born in mainland France and is of Guadeloupean descent. He's been a youth international for France. He debuted for the Guadeloupe national team in a friendly 2–0 loss to Cape Verde on 23 March 2022.

Career statistics

References

External links
 
 
 

1997 births
Living people
Sportspeople from Sens
Association football forwards
Guadeloupean footballers
Guadeloupe international footballers
French footballers
France youth international footballers
Manchester City F.C. players
NAC Breda players
RC Lens players
FC Metz players
K.V. Oostende players
Eredivisie players
Ligue 1 players
Ligue 2 players
Belgian Pro League players
French people of Guadeloupean descent
French expatriate footballers
Guadeloupean expatriate footballers
Expatriate footballers in England
Expatriate footballers in the Netherlands
Expatriate footballers in Belgium
French expatriate sportspeople in England
French expatriate sportspeople in the Netherlands
French expatriate sportspeople in Belgium
Guadeloupean expatriate sportspeople in England
Guadeloupean expatriate sportspeople in the Netherlands
Guadeloupean expatriate sportspeople in Belgium
Footballers from Bourgogne-Franche-Comté